A drink mix is a processed-food product, designed to mix usually with water to produce a beverage resembling fruit juice or soda in flavor. Another type of drink mix is represented by products that are mixed into milk. It is traditionally made in powdered form (powdered drink mix), but liquid forms are also seen now.

History
The first juice-type powdered drink mix was Poly Pop, invented by Paul Stevens Hollis in 1922. He sold it as part of the Big State Company until its acquisition by General Foods in 1953.

Ingredients

While some are made with sugar, or sold unsweetened, the products are often made with artificial sweeteners such as aspartame, sucralose, cyclamates or saccharin, and often include artificial flavors and colors. Some of the products include vitamins or other nutrients.
The products are variously marketed and to the point to children, athletes, bodybuilders, dieters, or as a vitamin supplement. Some brands are only sold as drink mixes, while some beverage companies produce powdered versions of their products, as do Gatorade and Ocean Spray. Another form of drink mix is represented by products mixed into milk, such as malted milk, Nesquik, Ovaltine, and Carnation Instant Breakfast.

Drink mix brands
 Nesquik (mix)
 Burple
 Country Time
 Crystal Light (primarily to female dieters)
 Emergen-C (vitamin supplement, with sugar or unsweetened)
 Flavor Aid (primarily marketed to children)
 Funny Face, (primarily marketed to children) 
 Kool-Aid (primarily marketed to children)
 Fruty
 Milo (drink)
 Tang
 MiO
 Cedevita
 Bolero
 G Fuel
 PRIME Hydration+ Sticks

See also

 Instant coffee
 Instant tea
 Powdered milk
 Squash (drink)

References

Soft drinks
Dietary supplements
Instant foods and drinks
Powdered drink mixes